Just Love is the debut album by singer Brian Courtney Wilson. The album was released on June 2, 2009 in the United States. The title song received a Dove Award nomination at the 41st GMA Dove Awards. A deluxe edition of the album was released on October 5, 2010, accompanied by a nationwide tour.

Recording

Wilson was signed to Music World, after Mathew Knowles heard Wilson's song "Already Here". Stan Jones was selected to produce and the album was recorded in Jackson, Mississippi.

Track listing

Chart performance

Just Love debuted at No. 2 on the Billboards Top Gospel Album chart and No. 6 on Billboard'''s Top Christian Album chart. The CD has remained at No. 1 on Christian Music Trade Association's (CMTA) Inspirational Album chart for nearly 50 weeks. Since its release in June 2009, the CD has held steady in the Top 15 on the Billboard Top Gospel Album chart for over 83 weeks.[ Just Love] on Billboard

Also, the song "Just Love" peaked at No. 14 on Billboard'''s Gospel Songs and has spent 19 weeks on the chart. The song "All I Need" peaked at No. 6 and has spent 83 weeks on the chart. The song "Already Here" also peaked at No. 13.

Awards

In 2010, the song "Just Love" was nominated to a Dove Award for Urban Recorded Song of the Year, at the 41st GMA Dove Awards.

References 

2009 albums